The Deputy Assistant Secretary of the Navy for Ship Programs (DASN Ships) serves as the principal adviser to the Assistant Secretary for Research, Development and Acquisition on issues involving surface ships, submarines and associated weapon systems.

The DASN monitors and advises the assistant secretary on programs managed by the Naval Sea Systems Command, PEO Ships, PEO Carriers, PEO Submarines, Military Sealift Command, and Strategic Systems Programs.  DASN (Ships) also represents ASN (RDA) on the board of directors for the Naval Aviation Enterprise, the Under Sea Enterprise, and the Surface Warfare Enterprise.

The current DASN (Ships) is Bilyana Anderson.

References

External links
 DASN (Ships) website

Office of the Secretary of the Navy